Jodie Turner may refer to:

Jodie Turner, minor character in Australian television drama series Big Sky played by Sharyn Hodgson

See also
 Jodie Turner-Smith (born 1986), British model and actress